"Walkin' the Dog" is a song written by Shelton Brooks in 1916. Written for the Dancing Follies of 1916, its chorus is:

References

Bibliography
Brooks, Shelton. "Walkin' the Dog" (Sheet Music). Chicago: Will Rossiter (1916).

External links
"Walkin' the Dog", National Promenade Band (Edison Blue Amberol 2967, 1917)—Internet Archive.

1916 songs
Songs about dancing

Songs about dogs
Novelty and fad dances
Blues songs
Jazz songs
Songs written by Shelton Brooks